The Chief Government Whip of Ontario is the member of the government responsible for ensuring that members of the governing party attend and vote in the provincial Legislature as the party leadership desires.

The current Chief Government Whip is Ross Romano of the Progressive Conservative Party of Ontario.

List of whips

References 

Government of Ontario